Granite is an unincorporated community in Baltimore County, Maryland, United States.  Originally known as Waltersville, it was renamed Granite in recognition of its principal product (the Woodstock Quartz Monzonite was quarried).  The village was the center of this industry, which during its peak in the late 19th century provided building materials for major projects throughout the eastern seaboard.

The Granite Historic District was listed on the National Register of Historic Places in 1994.

The Nike Missile Base BA-79 was located in Granite.  It was active from 1954 to 1974.

In 1999, final scenes of The Blair Witch Project were filmed in the Griggs House in Patapsco Valley State Park. The state planned on demolishing the historic structure until publicity from the movie brought contributors for its preservation. The house was demolished at a later date without an announcement.

References

Unincorporated communities in Baltimore County, Maryland
Unincorporated communities in Maryland